Madge Gill (1882–1961), born Maude Ethel Eades, was an English outsider and visionary artist.

Early years

Born 19 January 1882, an illegitimate child in East Ham, Essex, (now Greater London), she spent much of her early years in seclusion because her family couldn't stand the embarrassment.  At age 9, despite her mother still being alive, she was placed in Dr. Barnardo’s Girls’ Village Home orphanage at Barkingside, Ilford, Essex.

In 1896, she was sent to Canada by Dr. Barnardo's Homes as a British Home Child, arriving aboard the S.S. Scotsman as one of a group of 254 children destined to become farm laborers and domestic servants for Canadian families. Upon arrival at Quebec City, she and the other girls in her travel party were taken by train to Barnardo’s Hazelbrae Home in Peterborough, Ontario before being sent out on placements as domestics.  Her name, Maud Eades, can be found inscribed on the “Additions and Corrections” side panel installed on the Hazelbrae Barnardo Home Memorial in Peterborough in 2019. After spending her teenage years working as a domestic servant and caregiver for young children on a series of Ontario farms, she managed to move back to East Ham in 1900 to live with her aunt, who introduced her to Spiritualism and astrology. During that time, she found work as a nurse at Whipps Cross Hospital, in Leytonstone.

At the age of 25, she married her cousin, Thomas Edwin Gill, a stockbroker. Together they had three sons; their second son  Reginald, died of the Spanish flu. The following year she gave birth to a stillborn baby girl and almost died herself, contracting a serious illness that left her bedridden for several months and blind in her left eye.

Artistic works

During her illness, in 1920, Gill – now thirty-eight – took a sudden and passionate interest in drawing, creating thousands of allegedly mediumistic works over the following 40 years, most done with ink in black and white. She claimed to be guided by a spirit she called "Myrninerest" (my inner rest) and often signed her works in this name. As American scholar Daniel Wojcik noted, "like other Spiritualists, Gill did not attribute her art to her own abilities, but considered herself to be a physical vessel through which the spirit world could be expressed." However, she experimented with a wide variety of media including knitting, writing, weaving, and crochet work. Extremely prolific, she was capable of completing dozens of drawings in a single night. The figure of a young woman in intricate dress appeared thousands of times in her work and is often thought to be a representation of herself or her lost daughter, and in general female subjects dominate her work. Her drawings are characterised by geometric chequered patterns and organic ornamentation, with the blank staring eyes of female faces and their flowing clothing interweaving into the surrounding complex patterns.

In 1922, Gill became a patient of Dr Helen Boyle after Thomas Gill contacted the Essex Voluntary Association for the Blind, concerned for his wife's mental health. Dr. Boyle admitted Gill for treatment at the Lady Chichester Hospital in Hove, known for progressive and kind treatment of women, and is thought to have been encouraging about Gill's creation of art.

In 1939, she exhibited one of her works at the Whitechapel Gallery. It was probably one of her largest works, measuring 40 meters wide, covering an entire wall in the gallery. She continued to exhibit her work each year at the Whitechapel Gallery up until 1947.

Later years

She rarely exhibited her work and never sold any pieces out of fear of angering  "Myrninerest". After her firstborn son, Bob, died in 1958 she started drinking heavily and stopped drawing. Following her death in 1961, thousands of drawings were discovered in her home; the collection is owned by the London Borough of Newham and is in the care of the borough's Heritage and Archives Service. Her work has been exhibited internationally at venues including The Los Angeles County Museum of Art, USA (1992), Manor Park Museum, London (1999), The Whitechapel Gallery, London (2006), Slovak National Gallery, Bratislava (2007), Halle Saint Pierre (Musée d'Art Brut & Art Singulier), Paris (2008, 2014), Kunsthalle Schirn, Frankfurt a.M. (2010), Collection de l'Art Brut, Lausanne (2005, 2007).

Exhibitions

From 5 October 2013 to 26 January 2014, Gill's work was displayed at the Orleans House Gallery.

A major trilogy of exhibitions, showing over 600 of Gill's work, many previously unseen, took place at The Nunnery Gallery in London. It opened in May 2012 and lasted until January 2013.

In summer 2019 Sophie Dutton curated Myrninerest at the William Morris Gallery in Walthamstow, which included 'newly uncovered large-scale embroideries, textiles and archival objects, many of which [had] never been exhibited before.

Some of her drawings are on permanent view in The Viktor Wynd Museum of Curiosities, Fine Art & Natural History, whilst others are held by the London Borough of Newham Heritage Service.

Recognition

Madge Gill, like many outsider artists, has continually been gaining fame since her death in 1961. Her work is part of the permanent collection at the Collection de l'Art Brut in Lausanne, Switzerland, one of the central venues for the exhibition and support of outsider art.

In 2013, admirer David Tibet, himself an outsider artist, published an antiquarian-style book solely devoted to her work, the first of its kind.

On 8 March 2018 a blue plaque commemorating Gill was erected at 71 High Street, Walthamstow, where she was born in 1882 and lived until 1890.

In 2021, an exhibition Nature in mind curated by Sophie Dutton and consisting of 20 reproductions of her work was installed at various locations in east London as part of The Line art trail.

References

External links
The Newham Story
Collection of Madge Gill drawings at Henry Boxer Gallery

Outsider artists
1882 births
1961 deaths
British women artists
Women outsider artists
Spiritual mediums
Drawing mediums
Draughtsmen